Henry Frederick Barnes-Lawrence (1815– 1896) was an Anglican clergyman, notable as the ornithologist who founded the Association for the Protection of Sea-Birds and with others (Francis Orpen Morris; William Thomson, Archbishop of York; and Christopher Sykes, MP) generated the pressure which led to the 1869 Sea Birds Preservation Act.

Early life
Barnes was born in Surat on 11 February 1815; and educated at Clare College, Cambridge.

Church
He entered the Church of England and became curate at St Luke's, Chelsea then St James, Ryde. In 1849 he became Rector of Bridlington.

Personal life
In 1841 he married Emily Lloyd, who was the daughter of the then Incumbent of St Dunstan-in-the-West. They had eight children: Arthur Evelyn (born 1851), Herbert Cecil (born 1852, died 1926), Ashley Lawrence (born 1854), Lionel Aubrey Walter (born 1855), Ernest Frederick (born 1857, died 1915), Ada Florence (born 1859, died 1922), Clement Henry (born 1861, died 1887) and Emily Constance (born 1864). It seems likely that Cyril Henry Frederick Barnes-Lawrence, who became Master of Britannia Royal Naval College, Dartmouth was a grandson, rather than a son, as previously stated.

Death
Barnes-Lawrence died at Bridlington on 29 May 1896.

References

English conservationists
People from Surat
1815 births
1896 deaths
Alumni of Clare College, Cambridge
19th-century English Anglican priests